New Horizons College is an Islamic school in Minna, Niger State, Nigeria, which was established in 1995. The school is one of four schools founded by an Islamic education trust fund, the Islamic Educational Trust, Minna.

Background
The New Horizon College, Minna is a co-education school, with a blend of Islamic touch. The female and male students are kept in separate classes for religious believe.

Curriculum
The school curriculum is based on both Nigerian Curriculum (National Curriculum, IGCSE 'O' level ) and the Islamic standard.

References

External links
 

Secondary schools in Nigeria
Education in Niger State
Religious schools in Nigeria